Ryan Paul Seager (born 5 February 1996) is an English professional footballer who plays as a forward for National League side Dorking Wanderers. He has been capped twice for England U17.

Club career

Southampton
Seager made his debut for the club in an FA Cup fourth round tie against Crystal Palace on 24 January 2015, replacing Shane Long in the 72nd minute of a 3–2 home defeat.

On 29 January 2016, Seager signed for League One side Crewe Alexandra on a one-month youth loan deal. He scored his first career goal for Crewe on 16 February in a 2–2 draw at Rochdale, but was badly injured in the same game; the injury was subsequently diagnosed as a ruptured anterior cruciate ligament, and Seager returned to Southampton for rehabilitation. In July 2017, he signed a new two-year contract with the club, before completing a season-long loan switch to League One club Milton Keynes Dons. Seager scored his first goal for Milton Keynes Dons in a 1–4 home EFL Cup second round defeat to Swansea City.

On 26 January 2018, Seager was recalled by Southampton and immediately sent out on loan to League Two club Yeovil Town.

On 14 July 2018, it was announced that Seager had joined Dutch side Telstar on a season-long loan. Seager returned to Southampton in January 2019.

Yeovil Town
On 29 January 2019, Seager signed for his hometown club Yeovil Town on a free transfer from Southampton.

After struggling to get first team minutes at Yeovil, on 4 September 2019, Seager joined National League South side Havant & Waterlooville on loan until January 2020. On 12 March 2020, Seager joined Southern League Division One South side Frome Town on loan until the end of the 2019–20 season.

Hungerford Town
On 9 July 2020, following the expiry of his contract with Yeovil Town, Seager joined National League South club Hungerford Town on a two-year deal. Seagar scored 14 goals in just 19 matches for Hungerford before the season was concluded early and declared null and void on 18 February 2021.

Dorking Wanderers
On 8 June 2022, Seager joined newly promoted National League side Dorking Wanderers for an undisclosed fee.

International career
Seager received his first international call-up, in January 2013, to the England national under-17 team for the following month's Algarve Tournament. He made two appearances in the tournament, with England failing to win any of their matches.

Career statistics

Honours
Southampton
U21 Premier League Cup: 2014–15

References

External links

1996 births
Living people
People from Yeovil
English footballers
Association football forwards
England youth international footballers
Southampton F.C. players
Crewe Alexandra F.C. players
Milton Keynes Dons F.C. players
Yeovil Town F.C. players
SC Telstar players
Havant & Waterlooville F.C. players
Frome Town F.C. players
Hungerford Town F.C. players
Dorking Wanderers F.C. players
Premier League players
English Football League players
National League (English football) players
Eerste Divisie players
English expatriate footballers
Expatriate footballers in the Netherlands
English expatriate sportspeople in the Netherlands